Charles Pelham may refer to:

 Charles Pelham (died 1763), British landowner and politician
 Charles Pelham (congressman) (1835–1908), U.S. Representative from Alabama
 Charles Pelham, Lord Worsley (1887–1914), British peer who died in action during the First World War
 Charles Pelham (1781-1846), 1st Earl of Yarborough
 Charles Pelham, 4th Earl of Yarborough (1859–1936), British peer
 Charles Pelham, 8th Earl of Yarborough (born 1963), British peer and landowner
 Charles Anderson-Pelham, 1st Baron Yarborough (1749–1823), British politician